Qeshlaq-e Sharqi Rural District is in Qeshlaq Dasht District of Bileh Savar County, Ardabil province, Iran. At the census of 2006, its population was 10,802 in 2,283 households; there were 9,560 inhabitants in 2,452 households at the following census of 2011; and in the most recent census of 2016, the population of the rural district was 10,052 in 2,881 households. The largest of its 130 villages was Ruh Kandi, with 1,576 people.

References 

Bileh Savar County

Rural Districts of Ardabil Province

Populated places in Ardabil Province

Populated places in Bileh Savar County